Berkemer v. McCarty, 468 U.S. 420 (1984), is a decision of the United States Supreme Court which ruled that, in the case of a person stopped for a misdemeanor traffic offense, once they are in custody, the protections of the Fifth Amendment apply to them pursuant to the decision in Miranda v. Arizona 384 U.S. 436 (1966). Previously, some courts had been applying Miranda only to serious offenses.

Background
An officer observed the defendant's car weaving  in and out of its traffic lane. The officer stopped defendant and asked him to get out of his car. The officer noticed that the defendant was having difficulty standing. The defendant's speech was slurred and difficult to understand. Defendant could not perform a "balancing test" without falling.

The officer then asked the defendant if he had consumed any intoxicants. Defendant said that he drank two beers and smoked several joints of marijuana shortly before being stopped. The officer then arrested the defendant and took him to the county jail where the defendant took an intoxilyzer test. The test results were negative for the presence of alcohol.

The officer then resumed questioning the defendant. The defendant responded affirmatively when asked if he had been drinking. When asked if he was under the influence of alcohol said "I guess, barely." At no time was the defendant advised of his Miranda rights.

The trial court denied the defendant's motion to suppress his pre and post arrest statements. After exhausting his state appeals, the defendant filed a motion for writ of habeas corpus. The federal district court denied the motion. The court of appeals reversed holding that "Miranda warnings must be given to all individuals prior to custodial interrogation, whether the offense investigated is a felony or a misdemeanor traffic offense, and that respondent's post-arrest statements, at least, were inadmissible." The Supreme Court granted certiorari to consider two issues - whether the Miranda  rule applies to defendants charged with a misdemeanor and whether an investigative detention is equivalent to Miranda custodial interrogation.

Opinion of Court
 Miranda applies to custodial interrogations involving minor traffic offenses.
 Routine questioning of motorists detained pursuant to traffic stops is not custodial interrogation under Miranda.

The Miranda rule prohibits the use of testimonial evidence in criminal proceedings that is the product of custodial police interrogation unless the police properly advised the defendant of his Fifth Amendment rights and the defendant knowingly, intelligently and voluntarily waived those rights and agreed to talk to the police. The circumstances triggering the Miranda safeguards are "custody" and "interrogation." Custody means formal arrest or the deprivation of freedom to an extent associated with formal arrest. Interrogation means explicit questioning or actions that are reasonably likely to elicit an incriminating response. Unquestionably the defendant in Berkemer was interrogated. In fact, he was interrogated twice - prearrest roadside questioning and post arrest questioning at the jail. In neither case had the officer advised the defendant of his Miranda rights. As for post arrest interrogation, the defendant was in custody since he had been arrested. The issue for the court was whether to create an exception to Miranda for custodial interrogations that related to minor offenses.

The Supreme Court declined to carve out such an exception because to do so would sacrifice the certainty and clarity of the Miranda rule. The pre arrest interrogation raised the issue of whether detention was equivalent to custody for purposes of the Miranda rule. In its opinion, the Court stated:

The Court found that there were two significant differences between interrogation of person taken into custody and detainees. First was the length of the detention. Investigative detentions were brief and usually culminated in the issuance of a citation and release of the defendant. Second, the circumstances attendant to roadside detention were substantially less coercive and compulsive than those typically surrounding custodial interrogation. Specifically the Court noted that during most traffic stops the actions of the officer were "exposed" to public view and that stops typically involved only one or two officers.

A police officer can stop a vehicle if he has a reasonable articulable reason to suspect that "criminal activity is occurring."

The officer may detain for sufficient time to conduct a reasonable investigation that either confirms or dispels his suspicions.

The officer is not required to arrest the suspect once the officer has PC. The officer may delay the arrest for purposes of conducting a non-custodial interrogation.

The officer may interrogate the suspect without advising him of his Miranda rights.

References

External links
 

History of law enforcement in the United States
United States Fifth Amendment self-incrimination case law
United States Supreme Court cases
1984 in United States case law
United States Supreme Court cases of the Burger Court